Epigenetics are stable heritable traits that cannot be explained by changes in DNA sequence.

Epigenetic(s) may also refer to:

 Epigenetics (journal)
 Epigenetic robotics
 Epigenetic valley
 Epigenetic ice wedge
 Epigenetic ore deposits, minerals, mineral assemblages, or structural features

See also
 Epigenesis (disambiguation)